Estelle Ricketts (1871–?) was an American composer.

Personal life
Ricketts lived in Darby, Pennsylvania, which is now a suburb of Philadelphia.  She lived with her mother, her younger brother, and her father, who operated a boarding stable.  She was the only one in her family who could read and write.

Career
Estelle Ricketts's 1893 parlor piano piece, “Rippling Spring Waltz,” is the earliest known piano solo written by a black woman.   Estelle Rickets is mentioned in a book entitled "The Work of the Afro-American Woman," written by Mrs. Gertrude Bustill Mossell.  This book highlights the achievements of African-American women in all different disciplines, and was published in 1908.

Notes

References
Walker-Hill, Helen.  “Music by Black Women Composers at the American Music Research Center.”  American Music Research Center Journal.  2.1 (1992): 23-52.
Mossell, N. F.  "The Work of  the Afro-American Woman."  Philadelphia: Geo. S. Ferguson Company, 1908.

American women composers
1871 births
Year of death missing
19th-century American composers
19th-century women composers
19th-century American women musicians
African-American_women_composers